A simplified planning zone (SPZ) is an area of land in the United Kingdom earmarked for specific development where the planning process is relaxed in order to encourage development. Advice on SPZs is given in Planning Policy Statement 5 PPG 5

Simplified planning zones together with local development orders are an optional part of the local development documents required by the local development framework.

United Kingdom planning policy